Perreau is a French-language surname. It may refer to:

Ben Perreau, British journalist and entrepreneur 
Bruno Perreau, French political scientist and professor of French Studies
Gigi Perreau (born 1941), American actress
Yann Perreau, Canadian singer from Quebec
Stéphan Perreau, (born 1969), French flautist and art historian

See also
Louis de Perreau, Sieur de Castillon, French ambassador to England during the reign of Henry VIII
Perot (disambiguation)
Perrot (disambiguation)

French-language surnames
Surnames of French origin